SS Viet-Nam was an Ocean Liner built in Dunkirk, France for Messageries Maritimes in 1953. Viet-Nam was built along with two sister ships, the SS Cambodge and SS Laos (all three were nicknamed 'les blancs'/the 'whites' by their crews, because of their colour). She mainly provided passenger service between France, the Middle East, Southeast Asia, and Japan.

The Viet-Nam was renamed Pacifique in 1967, and was sold to Malaysian owners in 1970 for use as a pilgrim ship to Mecca. The Pacifique (renamed several times since 1970) was destroyed by fire and capsized in Singapore in 1974, and was broken up in Kaohsiung, Taiwan in 1976.

Construction
The French shipping company Messageries Maritimes ordered three identical ships to be built around the late 1940s to provide passenger and mixed-freight service on a route between Marseilles and Yokohama via ports in South Asia. The first to be completed was Viet-Nam in 1952, which was built by Société des Ateliers & Chantiers in Dunkirk, Nord, in northern France. The name was derived from Vietnam. She was launched on 14 October 1951, then completed and delivered to Messageries Maritimes in July 1953.

Viet-Nam and her sisters were mid-sized liners. Viet-Nam could carry 279 passengers on 7 decks — 117 in first class, 110 in second (tourist) class, and 52 in third (steerage or cabin) class.

Career
Viet-Nam departed on her maiden voyage on 17 July 1953. Her route linked Marseilles with various ports along the Suez Canal, Red Sea, Indian Ocean, South China Sea, and western Pacific Ocean. From Marseilles, she sailed across the Mediterranean Sea and through the Suez Canal and Red Sea to Port Said and Suez in Egypt, Aden in Yemen; Djibouti; across the Indian Ocean to Bombay, India; Colombo, Sri Lanka; and the island of Singapore; through the South China Sea to Saigon, Vietnam; Manila, Philippines; Hong Kong, and along the Pacific coast of Asia to finally reach Kobe and Yokohama in Japan. In 1961, Viet-Nam was refit, increasing the space of the vessels third class cabin space, and increasing her tonnage to 13,473. In 1966, the Viet-Nam was chartered to Club Mediterranée for use as a Cruise Ship, but was unsuccessful due to financial issues. Viet-Nam served just three cruises under charter before the Six-Day War closed the Suez Canal, putting an end to the charter.

On 29 September 1967, Viet-Nam was renamed Pacifique, and continued regular passenger service until 1970, when Viet-Nam and her sister ship Laos were sold to Abeto SA. Renamed Princess Abeto, the vessel was rebuilt to carry over 1,600 Muslim pilgrims to Mecca. The Viet-Nams other sister ship, Cambodge, was bought by Sun Lines, a Greek cruise line, converted into a cruise ship, and ultimately scrapped at Alang, India in 2003. The Princess Abeto was renamed Malaysia Baru in 1971, and Malaysia Kita in 1972.

Fate
On 12 May 1974, Malaysia Kita caught fire and capsized while anchored under repairs in Singapore harbor. There were no casualties, and the wreck of the Malaysia Kita was refloated in June 1975, and sold for scrap at Kaohsiung, Taiwan, arriving in May 1976 to be broken up.

References

1951 ships
Cruise ships
Ocean liners
Passenger ships of France
Steamships of France